Bournemouth School is a boys' grammar school and co-educational sixth form in Charminster, Bournemouth, Dorset, England, for children aged 11 to 18.

History

The school was founded by Dr. E. Fenwick and opened on 22 January 1901, admitting 54 boys. The 1906 syllabus included natural science, drawing, vocal music, drill, and gymnastics alongside history, geography, shorthand, and book keeping. During the First World War, at least 651 young men who had been or were attached to the school served, and 98 of those died, while 95 were wounded. The roll of honour for the former students who died in service can be found inside the school's main entrance.

The school moved to the present East Way site in 1939, formerly occupying buildings in Porchester Road and Lowther Road.

From 1939 to 1945, the school housed over 600 members from Taunton's School, Southampton (then a grammar, now a sixth form college), due to evacuation from large cities. Among the Taunton staff was English master Horace King, later Lord Maybray-King, Speaker of the House of Commons.

On 2 June 1940, about 800 French soldiers evacuated form Dunkirk were temporarily billeted in the school. Additional gas cookers were installed in the kitchen (now Languages Office) and staff were involved in preparing food and drink for the soldiers who occupied corridors and form rooms. One form room was used a temporary hospital for the more seriously wounded. Two days later, a further 300 arrived and remained in the school for about a week. On 19 June, after the French had been moved elsewhere, 400 or so British soldiers arrived, having been rescued from Cherbourg by the Royal Navy. It was agreed they would occupy the ground floor, leaving the senior school to carry out their summer examinations in the rooms above. Normal education resumed on 26 June.

Headmasters

 1901 E. Fenwick
 1932 J. E. Parry
 1957 E. G. Bennett
 1971 H. P. Harper
 1982 J. A. B. Kelsall
 1987 A. F. P. Petrie
 1996 J. Granger
 2009 D. P. Lewis

Buildings
 The original Victorian school buildings occupied a plot in Porchester Road. Adjacent to the main school was the purpose-built boarding house (pictured), in which the headmaster and a select number of boarders lived (at an annual fee of 12 guineas). As the number of students increased (200 in 1904, 306 in 1914, 479 in 1925), so too did the accommodation; the school encompassed a former Royal Victoria Hospital in 1925 for lower school classes, which was situated in the nearby Lowther Road. The two sites were known within the school as "Porchester" and "Lowther".

In 1935, planning for new school buildings on the northern fringe of Charminster began. Various proposals were considered and the Council decided to allocate 10 acres for the new school in East Way. Building operations were begun early in 1937 and the Foundation Stones were laid on 25 May. They were erected from the designs and under the supervision of W. L. Clowes, Borough Engineer and Architect from 1936 onwards.

They opened in 1939 and were first occupied by the boys from Porchester and Lowther and evacuees from Taunton's School in Southampton. Soon after, HORSA huts were erected to the north of the main buildings to house more classrooms. Further extensions to the buildings were made in subsequent years, with the canteen (previously above the Old Gym) built in 1957, a new physics laboratory built in 1958, Rooms 40 and 41 (now 9 and 10) in 1959, a new chemistry laboratory in 1961, a steel-framed structure above the single-storey north-eastern section (at the time of building, notorious for rocking in the wind) in the early 1990s and office space for Housemasters and admin staff later in 1992 (at the time the present House system was introduced). Larger scale building works include the Sixth Form Block in 1968, the Art & Technology blocks in the 1990s (replacing the HORSA huts), the Maths Blocks, which at the time of construction (between 2005-2007) was used for religious studies and mathematics but now the eight classrooms are exclusively purposed for the latter and the Sir David English Centre in 1999 (replacing the increasingly neglected, vandalised and subsequently demolished pavilions that were used for physical education and sports events). The Sixth Form Block made no provision for social space, and so the Sixth Form Memorial Hall (now an unused drama studio) was opened in 1974 to provide a common room for use by the students. What was formerly a bike shed beneath the Junior Playground, and then a woodwork room, now forms the Sixth Form common room.
 In 1973, the school hall burnt down. Evidence of the fire can be seen in the wooden flooring tiles in the doorway of Room 21. The new hall was opened in 1975. Its floorpan encompassed what had previously been two corridors running along either side of the old hall, thereby making much better use of space. Furthermore, the old hall had no electricity supply or dressing rooms, meaning that despite the short-term disruption, Bournemouth School now has a larger and much better-equipped facility for assemblies, productions and other events.

The old sites in Porchester Road and Lowther Road were used by Portchester School from 1940 until 1989, when it moved to Harewood Avenue. The boarding house was demolished to make way for the Wessex Way, "Lowther" was demolished in the 1980s, the site being redeveloped into the new Malmesbury Park Primary School, and "Porchester" was redeveloped in 1990 into Fenwick Court, a housing estate. Nothing, therefore, of the pre-East Way buildings remains.

In mid-2021, the school started work on a new building, planned to accommodate the increasing number of pupils. It was completed in January 2023, with the headmaster opening it alongside former pupil Alex James. The three-storey building contains six new language classrooms alongside a new MFL office, a canteen entitled Le Bistro, and a new sixth-form study centre.

Grammar school status
From the mid-1950s, 'grammar streams' were introduced in all Bournemouth secondary modern schools, and they effectively became bilateral schools. This idea was pioneered by the Chief Education Officer of the County Borough of Bournemouth from 1956–72, Walter Smedley (who died aged 98 in June 2006) who was a former technical college lecturer, and allowed easier movement between the 'grammar streams' in these schools and the grammar schools.  The system was nationally recognised, as it allowed greater flexibility, as is possible in comprehensive schools, but allowed academic standards to be maintained - people's ability was still recognised. Movement was down as well as up. The system was well supported by parents. The rate of pupils staying on at school in the sixth form was 50% higher than the national average in the 1960s. Selection to the grammar schools from 1965 was not assessed by a single exam, but continuously. In the late 1960s, Bournemouth's schools were producing GCE results 250% better than comprehensives in London's ILEA.

However, in 1969, Edward Short, Baron Glenamara, the Labour education secretary, condemned Bournemouth's education system. Once Smedley left in 1972, the bilateral schools later became comprehensives. The last school of this type was Oakmead College of Technology. Entrance exams for the grammar schools were also reintroduced. Bournemouth LEA still gets very good exam results, especially at A level. Dorset County Council took over from 1974-97.

In 2011, Bournemouth School ceased to hold its "selective grammar school" status, as it became an academy. The school kept its original name as well as its uniform and entrance examination through the change, but is now directly funded and overseen by the government rather than a local education authority.

Affiliations
The school shares playing fields with Bournemouth School for Girls and co-operates with them in theatre productions. Sixth form students often visit local primary schools to aid with teaching.

All Bournemouth School students use the Sir David English Sports Centre for physical education lessons. It has an indoor sports hall, four tennis and netball courts and three artificial turf football pitches.

The annual sports day, acting as the climax of the House Competition, takes place at the King's Park athletics stadium.

Girls in the sixth form

Bournemouth School accepted 15 female applicants to the sixth form for the first time in September 2012, and this number has risen since and in September 2013 37 female students joined the school.

Notable former pupils

Mark Austin, journalist and newscaster, current presenter of The News Hour with Mark Austin on Sky News
Daniel Avery, electronic music producer and DJ
Christian Bale, actor, left at age 16
Morley Bury, painter and artist
 Dennis Curry, geologist, president from 1963-65 of the Geologists' Association, grandson of Henry Curry (founder of Currys)
 Sir David English, journalist and editor of the Daily Mail from 1971–92
 Charlie Ewels, professional rugby union player, Bath Rugby
 Sir Brian Follett, chairman of the Training and Development Agency for Schools since 2003, and Vice-Chancellor of the University of Warwick from 1993–2001
 Charles Gray, actor
 Sir P. J. Grigg, Secretary of State for War, 1942-1945
 Benny Hill, comedian, writer
 James Inverne, artist manager and former editor of Gramophone; key in uncovering the Joyce Hatto fraud
 Alex James, bass player and occasional vocalist of band Blur
 Gareth Malone, choirmaster and broadcaster
Dick Moore, cricketer
Henry Moss (Tiskovitz), fashion entrepreneur; set up Lady Jane Boutique in Carnaby Street
Richard Palmer-James, co-founder of band Supertramp
Miles Reid, algebraic geometer
 Michael Roberts, (1902-1948), poet, writer, broadcaster and teacher
Ivan Rogers, former senior British civil servant
John Wetton, English singer, bassist and songwriter.
Tom Wise, former UKIP and Independent MEP jailed for fraud

References

External links
 Bournemouth School
 Old Bournemouthians

Schools in Bournemouth
Grammar schools in Bournemouth, Christchurch and Poole
Boys' schools in Dorset
Educational institutions established in 1901
1901 establishments in England
Academies in Bournemouth, Christchurch and Poole